Orbit Publications, also known as Orbit-Wanted, was an American comic book publishing house operated by the female publisher, editor, and cartoonist Ray Herman during the Golden Age of Comic Books. The company was co-owned by Herman and Marjorie May (niece of World Color Press owner Roswell Messing, Sr.).

Orbit operated from 1945 to 1955; the company's longest-running titles were Wanted Comics (crime), The Westerner (a Western title featuring Wild Bill Pecos) and Love Diary (romance); contributing artists included John Buscema, Syd Shores, Bernard Krigstein and Mort Leav.

Orbit was a founding member of the Association of Comics Magazine Publishers (the precursor to the Comics Magazine Association of America), for which Hermann served as secretary and board director.

Titles published 
 Love Diary (48 issues, July 1949 - September-October 1955) — romance
 Love Journal (16 issues, October 1951 - July 1954) – romance
 Patches (11 issues, [July] 1945 - December 1947) — Western title continued from Rural Home Publications title
 Taffy Comics (10 issues, 1946 - February 1948) — funny animal title continued from Rural Home
 Toytown Comics (5 issues, Aug. 1946–May 1947) — humor title continued from B. Antin series
 Wanted Comics (45 issues, September-October 1947 - April 1953) — crime comic; numbering continued from Toytown
 The Westerner Comics (28 issues, June 1948 - December 1951) — Western title

References

Notes

Sources 

 
 

Comic book publishing companies of the United States
Defunct comics and manga publishing companies
Publishing companies established in 1945